Tatar-e Olya (also Romanized as Tātār-e ‘Olyā; also known as Chaindara, Chalandara-Tatar, Tahtarī Kandareh, Tātār, Tātār-e Bālā, and Tatari) is a village in Minjavan-e Sharqi Rural District, Minjavan District, Khoda Afarin County, East Azerbaijan Province, Iran. At the 2006 census, its population was 372, in 84 families.

References 

Populated places in Khoda Afarin County